José Verdú Nicolás (born 1 January 1983), known as Toché, is a Spanish footballer who plays as a striker.

He played 297 matches in Segunda División over 11 seasons, scoring a total of 96 goals for Hércules, Valladolid, Numancia, Albacete, Cartagena, Deportivo and Oviedo. He added 32 appearances in La Liga, and also competed professionally in Greece.

Club career
Born in Santomera, Region of Murcia, Toché came up through the ranks of Atlético Madrid, making his first-team debut during the 2003–04 season in a 0–0 home draw against Deportivo de La Coruña. The following campaign he was loaned to CD Numancia, where he appeared in only five games as the club from Soria was eventually relegated from La Liga, although he was seriously injured in the process.

Toché spent the following seasons on loan at Hércules CF and Real Valladolid, both in the second division. He returned to Numancia for 2007–08, and appeared sporadically in the side's promotion.

On 30 December 2008, after having taken almost no part in the top-flight season, Toché left Numancia for second-tier side Albacete Balompié, signing a contract for the rest of the campaign and the next one. On 28 August of the following year, however, he moved teams again, joining promoted FC Cartagena. He had a breakthrough year in 2009–10, as they nearly achieved a second consecutive promotion, only missing two league matches – 3,317 minutes of action – and ranking in the Pichichi Trophy's top three.

On 19 July 2011, after scoring a further 16 league goals with Cartagena, Toché signed a three-year contract with Panathinaikos F.C. in Greece. He netted on his official debut for the team, making it 2–1 in an eventual 3–4 home loss against Odense Boldklub in the third qualifying round of the UEFA Champions League (5–4 aggregate defeat).

In November 2013, Toché cut ties with the Athens club after being unpaid for four months. On 20 January of the following year, he returned to his homeland and signed a short-term deal with Deportivo de La Coruña.

Toché scored four times for Depor during the season, as the Galicians returned to the top division at the first attempt. He netted his first goal in the competition on 20 September 2014, but in a 2–8 home loss to Real Madrid.

On 30 July 2015, Toché agreed to a one-year contract with Real Oviedo, newly promoted to the second tier. On 19 July 2019, having been a starter for the better part of his spell at the Estadio Carlos Tartiere, scoring 17 times in each of his first two seasons, the 36-year-old left by mutual consent.

Honours
Valladolid
Segunda División: 2006–07

Numancia
Segunda División: 2007–08

References

External links

1983 births
Living people
People from Huerta de Murcia
Spanish footballers
Footballers from the Region of Murcia
Association football forwards
La Liga players
Segunda División players
Segunda División B players
Atlético Madrid B players
Atlético Madrid footballers
CD Numancia players
Hércules CF players
Real Valladolid players
Albacete Balompié players
FC Cartagena footballers
Deportivo de La Coruña players
Real Oviedo players
Burgos CF footballers
Orihuela CF players
Super League Greece players
Panathinaikos F.C. players
Spain youth international footballers
Spanish expatriate footballers
Expatriate footballers in Greece
Spanish expatriate sportspeople in Greece